Éric Marester (born 12 June 1984) is a French former professional footballer who played as a defender. He spent his career playing for Troyes AC over ten years including SC Bastia in the French Ligue 2, for whom he played between 2005 and 2007 on two consecutives loans.

Career
On 20 July 2011, Marester signed a two-year contract with Ligue 2 side AS Monaco. He signed for Arles-Avignon in the 2012–13 season.

In July 2015, he joined Strasbourg from Ajaccio.

References

External links
 
 

1984 births
Living people
People from Villeneuve-la-Garenne
Footballers from Hauts-de-Seine
Association football defenders
French footballers
French people of Guadeloupean descent
Ligue 1 players
Ligue 2 players
ES Troyes AC players
SC Bastia players
AS Monaco FC players
AC Arlésien players
AJ Auxerre players
AC Ajaccio players
RC Strasbourg Alsace players